is a comic opera in five acts by Werner Egk, who was also the librettist. It is based on Nikolai Gogol's play The Government Inspector. The premiere on 9 May 1957 at the Schwetzingen Festival was conducted by the composer.

Recording
 Der Revisor – Nasrawi, Galkin, Dries, Zink, Hauser, Perio, Augsburg PO, Bihlmaier, Oehms Classics

References

External links 
 Egk: Der Revisor, andreas-praefcke.de
 Thorsten Stegemann in der Virtuellen Kulturregion / Werner Egk: Der Revisor, Kunstportal Baden-Württemberg

German-language operas
Operas by Werner Egk
1957 operas
Operas
Operas based on works by Nikolai Gogol
Works based on The Government Inspector